The 1933 Morgan Bears football team was an American football team that represented Morgan College in the Colored Intercollegiate Athletic Association (CIAA) during the 1933 college football season. In their fifth season under head coach Edward P. Hurt, the Bears compiled a 9–0 record, won the CIAA championship, shut out eight of nine opponents, and outscored all opponents by a total of 319 to 6. The Bears were recognized as the 1933 black college national champion. 

Morgan players receiving first-team All-CIAA honors included Howard K. Wilson at quarterback, Troupe at fullback, Tom Conrad at left halfback, Crawford at right end, Williams at left tackle, and Hill at center.

Schedule

References

Morgan
Morgan State Bears football seasons
College football undefeated seasons
Black college football national champions
Morgan Bears football